In number theory, a Wall–Sun–Sun prime or Fibonacci–Wieferich prime is a certain kind of prime number which is conjectured to exist, although none are known.

Definition 
Let  be a prime number.  When each term in the sequence of Fibonacci numbers  is reduced modulo , the result is a periodic sequence.
The (minimal) period length of this sequence is called the Pisano period and denoted . 
Since , it follows that p divides . A prime p such that p2 divides  is called a Wall–Sun–Sun prime.

Equivalent definitions 

If  denotes the rank of apparition modulo  (i.e.,  is the smallest positive index such that  divides ), then a Wall–Sun–Sun prime can be equivalently defined as a prime  such that  divides .

For a prime p ≠ 2, 5, the rank of apparition  is known to divide , where the Legendre symbol  has the values

This observation gives rise to an equivalent characterization of Wall–Sun–Sun primes as primes  such that  divides the Fibonacci number .

A prime  is a Wall–Sun–Sun prime if and only if .

A prime  is a Wall–Sun–Sun prime if and only if , where  is the -th Lucas number.

McIntosh and Roettger establish several equivalent characterizations of Lucas–Wieferich primes. In particular, let ; then the following are equivalent:

Existence 

In 1960, he wrote:

It has since been conjectured that there are infinitely many Wall–Sun–Sun primes. No Wall–Sun–Sun primes are known .

In 2007, Richard J. McIntosh and Eric L. Roettger showed that if any exist, they must be > 2.
Dorais and Klyve extended this range to 9.7 without finding such a prime.

In December 2011, another search was started by the PrimeGrid project, however it was suspended in May 2017. In November 2020, PrimeGrid started another project that searches for Wieferich and Wall–Sun–Sun primes simultaneously. The project ended in December 2022, definitely proving that any Wall–Sun–Sun prime must exceed  (about ).

History 
Wall–Sun–Sun primes are named after Donald Dines Wall, Zhi Hong Sun and Zhi Wei Sun; Z. H. Sun and Z. W. Sun showed in 1992 that if the first case of Fermat's Last Theorem was false for a certain prime p, then p would have to be a Wall–Sun–Sun prime. As a result, prior to Andrew Wiles' proof of Fermat's Last Theorem, the search for Wall–Sun–Sun primes was also the search for a potential counterexample to this centuries-old conjecture.

Generalizations 

A tribonacci–Wieferich prime is a prime p satisfying , where h is the least positive integer satisfying [Th,Th+1,Th+2] ≡ [T0, T1, T2] (mod m) and Tn denotes the n-th tribonacci number. No tribonacci–Wieferich prime exists below 1011.

A Pell–Wieferich prime is a prime p satisfying p2 divides Pp−1, when p congruent to 1 or 7 (mod 8), or p2 divides Pp+1, when p congruent to 3 or 5 (mod 8), where Pn denotes the n-th Pell number. For example, 13, 31, and 1546463 are Pell–Wieferich primes, and no others below 109 . In fact, Pell–Wieferich primes are 2-Wall–Sun–Sun primes.

Near-Wall–Sun–Sun primes 
A prime p such that  with small |A| is called near-Wall–Sun–Sun prime. Near-Wall–Sun–Sun primes with A = 0 would be Wall–Sun–Sun primes. PrimeGrid recorded cases with |A| ≤ 1000. A dozen cases are known where A = ±1 .

Wall–Sun–Sun primes with discriminant D 
Wall–Sun–Sun primes can be considered for the field  with discriminant D.
For the conventional Wall–Sun–Sun primes, D = 5. In the general case, a Lucas–Wieferich prime p associated with (P, Q) is a Wieferich prime to base Q and a Wall–Sun–Sun prime with discriminant D = P2 – 4Q. In this definition, the prime p should be odd and not divide D.

It is conjectured that for every natural number D, there are infinitely many Wall–Sun–Sun primes with discriminant D.

The case of  corresponds to the k-Wall–Sun–Sun primes, for which Wall–Sun–Sun primes represent the special case k = 1. For a prime p ≠ 2 and not dividing D, this condition is equivalent to either of the following.
 p2 divides , where  is the Kronecker symbol;
 Vp(k, −1) ≡ k (mod p2), where Vn(k, −1) is a Lucas sequence of the second kind.

The smallest k-Wall–Sun–Sun primes for k = 2, 3, ... are
13, 241, 2, 3, 191, 5, 2, 3, 2683, ...

See also 
 Wieferich prime
 Wolstenholme prime
 Wilson prime
 PrimeGrid
 Fibonacci prime
 Pisano period
 Table of congruences

References

Further reading

External links 
 Chris Caldwell, The Prime Glossary: Wall–Sun–Sun prime at the Prime Pages.
 
 Richard McIntosh, Status of the search for Wall–Sun–Sun primes (October 2003)
 

Classes of prime numbers
Unsolved problems in number theory